Naftogaz of Ukraine (Naftogaz Ukrainy; literally "Petro-Gas of Ukraine") is the largest national oil and gas company of Ukraine. It is a state-owned company subordinated to the Government of Ukraine. The vertical-integrated company carries out a complete cycle of exploration operations and development of deposits, operating and exploratory drilling, extraction, transportation, and refinement of natural gas and crude oil, supply of natural and liquefied gas to consumers.

Ukraine's system of trunk natural gas pipelines and underground natural gas depots is operated by Ukrtransgaz, a subsidiary of Naftogaz. As of 2009, the company had 38,200 km of high pressure gas transit pipelines and more than 30 billion cubic meters of gas storage capacity. This major gas infrastructure located between Russia and the European Union has led the company to feature prominently in regional politics. Another subsidiary of Naftogaz, Gas of Ukraine, is responsible for domestic gas distribution to the local district heating companies.

Naftogaz is a major Ukrainian employer with 68,386 employees (as of 2018). The former PwC management consultant Andriy Kobolyev took over as CEO after the 2014 Ukrainian revolution tasked with reducing the country's dependence on Russian gas and reforming the company's business practices.

The group is the largest taxpayer in Ukraine. In 2018, revenues of the group consisted of ₴137 billion of taxes and dividends, which is about 15% of total revenues of the state budget.

History

1991–1998: Ukrgasprom
After the dissolution of the Soviet Union in 1991, oil and gas industry of Ukraine governed by Derzhnaftogasprom went through number of changes. The National Commission for State Regulation of Energy (NKRE) was giving out certification for gas trading to anyone without order ignoring the Derzhnaftogasprom. Guided by decisions of the First Vice-Prime Minister (on Fuel and Energy Complex) Pavlo Lazarenko, licenses were given to such companies like United Energy Systems of Ukraine (EESU), Intergas, Olgas, International Trading Energy Resources Association (ITERA), Ukrzakordonnaftogas, Ukrgasprom, Motor Sich, and Donetsk Oblast factories (later those formed the Industrial Union of Donbas).

In the early 1990s, there was privatization of gas distribution regional network known as "oblgaz" belonging to "Ukrgas". The process took place unnoticed and when Naftogas was constituted, not all privately owned distributors wanted to transfer their own stocks to the statutory fund of the National Joint Stock Company. Along with the gas distribution network in the same way there were privatized enterprises of petroleum products provision including filling station and fuel repositories that belonged to "Ukrnaftoprodukt". The whole petroleum products retail network had to be created by Naftogaz from zero.

The predecessor of Naftogas is "Ukrgasprom".

On 28 January 1995 after discussion with government the condition of agreements realization in provision for Ukraine gas imported from Russia and Turkmenistan, the head of "Ukrgasprom" Bohdan Kliuk was dismissed from his post on decision of the Cabinet of Ministers. Bohdan Kliuk who was appointed on 6 December 1994, on 19 December 1994 signed an agreement with "Gazprom" on distribution of gas for Ukraine under disadvantageous conditions. The issue with Kliuk provided Bakai with an argument to create Naftogas.

1998–2014

The company was founded in 1998 after previously being named Ukrgazprom. The main initiators who created the company were Ihor Didenko and Ihor Bakai (better known as Igor Bakai). The last one was the first deputy chairman of the Ukrainian State Committee on Oil and Gas. Before Naftogaz, both Bakai and Didenko worked for other gas trading companies "Republic Corporation" and "Intergas".

At the end of 1990s, Ukraine was consuming a record of 75 billion m3 per year which was the fourth indicator in the world and seemed strange to say the least considering that the country was not part of the top 20 in GDP volume. Eighteen billion m3 were mined inside Ukraine by Naftogas along with some joint enterprises such as "Poltavska Naftogasova Kompania", Plast, Ukrnaftogastekhnologia and others. All the gas that was mined by Naftogas and received through transit in obligatory order was being sold to population and state organizations. The remaining volume of natural gas, Ukraine was receiving from Russia as part of payment for transit or was buying from Turkmenistan. That gas was sold to industrial enterprises or was being re-exported.

Also, instead of investing more funds in geological exploration for the Ukrgasprom, its money was used to patch budget and foreign debts holes, which led to decrease in mining of hydrocarbons and decline of industry. Most of oil refineries were sold out to Russian companies. The only refinery that belongs to Naftogas is Shebelynsky Gas Refinery which Naftogas controls through Ukrgasvydobuvannia. Ukraine never had enough mined oil resources capable to provide for oil refining capacity that Ukraine inherited from the Soviet Union. Most successful in oil mining is Ukrnafta, however recently Chornomornaftogas had more and more plans to develop newly found deposits.

Before 2001 Ukraine had two state enterprises in transportation of oil "Main oil pipeline "Druzhba" and "Cisdnieper main oil pipeline". The pipelines were often used by Russian companies, but after Ukraine built connecting pipeline Odessa – Brody (Black Sea coast – West Ukraine) Russian companies installed an alternative pipe route Sukhodolnaya–Rodionovskaya.

In 2001 several Ukrainian parliamentarians made inquiry to the Prosecutor's General Office, Tax Agency, and Security Service requesting to open a criminal case against the head of Presidential Administration Volodymyr Lytvyn, the former chairman of Naftogaz Ihor Bakai, the administration chairmen of joint-stock company "Ukrgasprom" Bohdan Kliuk, the director of state enterprise "Ukrgasprom" Illia Fik, and others. Those parliamentarians were Hryhoriy Omelchenko, Anatoliy Yermak, and Viktor Shyshkin.

As of 31 December 2008, Naftogaz with its subsidiaries had a total of 172,000 employees. Naftogaz received more than $6 billion of subsidies in domestic bonds from 2009 to 2012 as regulated gas prices and expensive Russian energy imports led to heavy losses.

2014–present

In August 2014, Ukrtransgaz, the operator of the Ukrainian gas transport system, along with its Slovakian counterpart "Eustream", launched natural gas supplies from Slovakia to Ukraine after signing a Memo of mutual understanding in April. This initiative was driven by Russia's decision in June to cease gas supplies to Ukraine in retaliation for the country seeking closer ties with the European Union. By launching reverse flows, Ukraine claims it is seeking no concessions – only implementation of existing EU law on EU territory. The Third Energy Package was proposed by the European Commission in 2007 and adopted by the European Parliament and the Council of the European Union in July 2009. This legislation clearly allows for gas to be traded like other commodities, thus creating a more efficient market which is less vulnerable to political pressure. In October 2014 the EU further committed to better connecting its energy grids, saying countries should be able to export 15% of their generation capacity by 2030. The consultancy firm Strategy& (formerly Booz & Co) believes the EU could save €40bn a year by 2030 if it integrates its energy grids.

Slovakia can provide more gas than Ukraine needs. In 2013, Ukraine imported 25.8bcm. Slovakia could provide Ukraine with 30bcm. Ukraine is asking that the EU fully support west-to-east exports to Ukraine, which would eliminate the scope for Russia to use gas as a weapon to achieve its political aims in Ukraine. Norway's energy giant Statoil began transiting gas eastwards from Slovakia in 2014, and Shell began in 2015.

In response to the reverse flows initiative, Russia has cut supplies to central and eastern European countries, seeking to prevent exports to Ukraine. In September, Hungary stopped supplying gas to Ukraine, days after a meeting between Hungarian Prime Minister Orban and Gazprom's CEO. Gazprom charges widely different prices to different European countries, which many believe is based on Russia's political goals in the region.

Ukraine is seeking arbitration from the "Stockholm Chamber of Commerce" to fairly assess past debts between the two countries and to establish a fair basis of future operations.

Since April 2014, Ukraine is the only non-EU country to voluntarily publish its volume in storage facilities on the EU transparency platform of Gas Storage Europe (GIE). The company also publishes data on the amount of gas entering and leaving the country.

In November 2014, Ukrtransgaz, the operator of Ukraine's gas transportation system, began posting daily statistics on the information platform of the European Network of Transmission System Operators for Gas (ENTSOG). Also, the same year Naftogaz launched a new website in order to showcase its transparency initiatives. In March 2018, "Naftogaz" won a trial against Russian Gazprom for shortened gas supplies before the Arbitration Institute of the Stockholm Chamber of Commerce, and was set to receive net amount of $2.56 billion.

As of 31 December 2017, Naftogaz has around 72,000 employees and annual revenue of €7.443 billion. Of total revenue, €2.908 billion (39.07%) is generated from oil and gas production, €2.415 billion (32.45%) from oil and gas transit, €1.137 billion (15.28%) from oil transmission and sales and €817 million (10.98%) is generated from gas transmission and sales. Also, a total transit volume in 2017 stood at six-year maximum of 93 billion cubic meters. The transit contract between the Naftogaz and Gazprom is set to expire in December 2019, after which Ukraine will cease to be the main transit country of Russian gas to the European Union countries.

In April 2019, the Chinese Sinosure agreed to loan $1 billion in insurance coverage to Naftogaz.

In the first half of 2022, Naftogaz had a deficit of $1.6 billion and as a consequence, went into default.

Three Gas Wars

The first war 
According to Gazprom, in February 1993, Ukraine's debt exceeded 138 billion rubles.

That year Gazprom signed an agreement in Warsaw on the construction of a transit gas pipeline "Yamal – Western Europe" bypassing Ukraine through the territory of Poland. In August, the export of energy resources to Ukraine was first terminated for five days.

In 1994, there were stops of gas supplies and new debt repayment requirements by transferring rights to Ukrainian gas pipelines and enterprises.

In 1997, a so called Agreement on friendship, cooperation and partnership with Russia, and a set of agreements on the Black Sea Fleet were signed.

The second war 
At the end of 2005, Gazprom in negotiations with Ukraine on the mode of transit and gas supplies has decided to increase gas price from 50–80$ to 160–170$ per thousand m³, motivating it a level of medium-European prices. Ukraine refused to sign contracts for gas supply till 2006.

On January 1, 2009, gas was discontinued for Ukraine, and since January 5, Gazprom decreased its supply for European consumers.

On April 21, 2010 in Kharkiv Viktor Yanukovych and Dmitry Medvedev signed a new agreement on the cost of procurement and transit of gas through the Ukrainian GTS, linking a decrease in the price of 30% with a continuation of the Rent Agreement in Sevastopol for 25 years, by 2042.

Gazprom and Naftogaz Association 
In July 2010, Prime Minister of Ukraine Mykola Azarov said that the Government of Ukraine is negotiating the creation of a gas transportation consortium between Ukraine, the EU and Russia.

On January 25, 2011 EU Energy Commissioner Günther Oettinger first stated that the allocation of funds of the EU for modernization of the Ukrainian GTS depends on the guarantees of Russia to the gas market to Europe, and advised the authorities to persuade the Russian side to refuse to build a "Southern Stream" gas pipeline and finance modernization of the Ukrainian GTS. Oettinger mentioned that the total bandwidth in the 2011–2012 submarine gas pipeline with a capacity of 55 billion m³ and the projected gas pipeline "Southern Flood" with a capacity of 63 billion m³ will be 118 billion m³ and will allow Russia to supply gas to the EU without the help of Ukraine or Belarus.

Structure
As of 31 December 2017, the Naftogaz has ownership shares in the following companies:

Production and refinery
 UkrGasVydobuvannya (UGV) (100%), a subsidiary
 Zakordonnaftogaz (100%), a subsidiary
 Ukrnafta (50% + 1), open joint-stock association
 Petrosannan Company (50%), Egypt-based joint-stock association
 Carpatygaz LLC (49.99%), joint-stock association
 Chornomornaftogaz, state joint-stock association, currently under control of the Russian authorities after the 2014 Russian annexation of Crimea

Transportation
 Ukrtransgaz (100%), a subsidiary
 Ukrtransnafta (100%), open joint-stock association
 Ukrspetstransgaz (100%), state joint-stock association

Wholesale and distribution
 Gaz Ukrainy (100%), a subsidiary
 Naftogaz Trading Europe S.A (100%), Swiss based company
 Kirovohradgaz (100%)
 Ukravtogaz (100%)

Subsidiary enterprises
 Vuhlesyntezgaz Ukraiiny (100%)
 Naftogaz-Energoservice (100%)

International activities
Ukraine now plays a vital role in both the storage and transit of gas in Europe and in improving EU energy security. Ukraine has the largest storage capacity in Europe, which enables the country and its European partners to accumulate over 30 bcm of gas during summer periods when prices are lowest. Ukraine is also strategically placed to play the role of a transit hub. Its interconnectors have the ability to transfer gas from central Europe to South-Eastern Europe, which is the most exposed region to Russia's gas monopoly. Naftogaz asserts that ensuring gas flows freely will significantly improve the liquidity and the stability of the EU market, making it more resilient to political pressure.

The company drills for oil in the Western Desert in Egypt. On December 13, 2006, Naftogaz and the Egyptian General Petroleum Corporation had signed an agreement on the exploration and development of oil and gas deposits on the eastern territory of Alam El Shawish East in the Western Egyptian desert. In 2014 Naftogaz began natural gas extraction in Egypt. The company's oil production in Egypt estimated at 260,000 tonnes for 2014, which is more than 10% of annual production in Ukraine. A new natural gas pipeline allowing for extraction of approximately 300,000 cubic meters per day has also been launched.

Corruption
The Yanukovych government was famously despotic and corrupt. Naftogaz has been seen as one of the biggest sources of corruption in Ukraine for years with many of the country's billionaires having acquired much of their wealth through gas arbitrage based on differences between the prices of Russian gas imports, gas exports to the EU and government energy subsidies to homes and businesses.

Yevgeny Bakulin
Yevgeny Bakulin, who was a close ally of former deputy prime minister Yuri Boiko, was appointed as the chief executive of state energy company Naftogaz in 2010 by the ousted president Viktor Yanukovich. Ukrainian police detained Bakulin in connection with a corruption investigation. Yevgeny Bakulin is still under three separate investigations into suspected corruption in the gas industry that has cost the Ukrainian state about $4 billion. Bakulin’s arrest is related to Dmytro Firtash’s arrest in Vienna on the 13th of March, 2014, as a direct consequence of Firtash’s arrest charges filed by FBI. This is due to the fact that Bakulin was an important player in the corruption scheme of Dmytro Firtash, Serhiy Lyovochkin, a Ukrainian politician – and Yuri Boiko, the former Energy Minister. Bakulin is suspected of heading a "criminal group" whose members include other senior current and former Ukrainian government members. Ukrainian police seized 42 kilograms of gold and $4.8 million in cash during a search of the apartments. Ukrainian investigators charged Bakulin with the theft of $243.5m from the company in one single case. Minister of Internal Affairs Arsen Avakov in comments at the time of Bakulin's arrest accused him of complicity in the theft of over $4bn from the company during his time in office from 2010 to 2014. 

Ukraine’s parliament approved the stripping of immunity from prosecution from Bakulin, a lawmaker from the Opposition Bloc, and to allow his arrest. The Prosecutor General’s Office has charged Bakulin with the embezzlement of particularly large amounts of money while he was serving as the head of Ukraine’s state oil and gas company, Naftogaz of Ukraine, in 2010.
The embezzlement was part of the so-called “Boyko’s Drilling Rigs” case, when, reportedly under the supervision of the Fuel and Energy Minister at the time, Yuriy Boyko, Naftogaz purchased two oil and gas rigs for $800 million, almost a double their real price, and allegedly laundered the overpaid money – some $330 million. Bakulin didn’t attend the parliament session, and despite the Rada’s approval of his arrest, he still had an opportunity to escape, as Prosecutor General Yuriy Lutsenko earlier told parliament that Bakulin was abroad now.

On April 25, four weeks after he was detained, a Kyiv court released Bakulin on bail of only UAH10m, around $1m. He is believed to have since left the country to Russia, ostensibly for urgent medical treatment in Israel.

Bakulin is currently wanted for being a subject of “Boyko’s tower” case. The Swiss Federal Criminal Court has granted assistance to Ukraine in the Bakulins case. Accused of fraud, he would have cashed million dollars on Swiss bank accounts in the name of his son and daughter, Nikolay and Svetlana. and Bakulin's sister Tatyana Malygina to buy real estates in Germany and Austria.

Bakulin’s link to Naftogaz illustrates why the continued influence of oligarchs will likely hamper the country’s drive to reform.

In October 2014, George Soros named Naftogaz to be "a black hole in the budget and a major source of corruption" and called for a radical reform of the company, which could "totally eliminate Ukraine's dependence on Russia for gas". Radio Free Europe/Radio Liberty produced a short documentary entitled "The Palaces of Ukraine's Oil and Gas Men" about the homes of Naftogaz management during the presidency of Viktor Yanukovych, who was overthrown in 2014.

In October 2019, Naftogaz got caught up in the impeachment proceedings against President Donald Trump in the US, when news broke that a group of businessmen with allegedly close ties to the President and his personal lawyer, Rudy Giuliani, intervened in an attempt to change the management of Naftogaz. An Associated Press report reveals how businessmen Lev Parnas, Igor Fruman and Harry Sargeant III allegedly attempted to replace Naftogaz CEO, Andriy Kobolyev, and sought to broker a deal to sell their own natural gas to the company.

Heads of the Boads
Directors of the company since 1998:
 1998–2000 Ihor Bakai
 2000–2000 Vasyl Rozghonyuk (acting)
 2000–2000 Ihor Didenko
 2000–2002 Vadym Kopylov
 2002–2005 Yuriy Boyko
 2005–2006 Oleksiy Ivchenko
 2006–2006 Oleksiy Bolkisyev
 2006–2007 Volodymyr Sheludchenko
 2007–2007 Yevhen Bakulin
 2007–2010 Oleh Dubyna
 2010–2014 Yevhen Bakulin
 2014–2021 Andriy Kobolyev
 2021–2022 Yuriy Vitrenko
 2022– Oleksiy Chernyshov

See also

 Natural gas transmission system of Ukraine
 Natural gas in Ukraine

References

External links
 
 
 Official website of Ministry of Fuel and Energy of Ukraine
 Zanuda, A. 20 years of Ukraine-Russia gas relations: want a peace – be ready for a war (20 років україно-російських газових відносин: хочеш миру – готуйся до війни). BBC Ukraine. 7 February 2013.
 Lisnychuk, O., Sushko, O. Are the political-economic groups an obstacle for political development in Ukraine? (Чи є політико-економічні групи перешкодою для політичного розвитку України?). Friedrich Ebert Foundation, Regional representation in Ukraine, Belarus and Moldova. Kyiv, 2005
 Yeryomenko, A. "Naftogaz Ukrayiny": Brief history in events and personalities («НАФТОГАЗ УКРАЇНИ»: КОРОТКА ІСТОРІЯ В ПОДІЯХ ТА ОСОБАХ). Mirror Weekly. 23 May 2003.
 Yeryomenko, A. Bohdan Klyuk: We consume gas as if to spite our enemies (Богдан КЛЮК: «У НАС ГАЗ ПОТРЕБЛЯЮТ, СЛОВНО НАЗЛО ВРАГАМ»). Mirror Weekly. 15 August 1997.
 An off-shore company will help Naftogas to restructure its debt (Офшор допоможе "Нафтогазу" реструктурувати борги). Асоціація «Газові трейдери України») (original source: Naftogas will restructure its debts through an off-shore company ("Нафтогаз" реструктурує борги через офшор?). Ukrayinska Pravda (Ekonomichna Pravda). 28 July 2009

 
Oil and gas companies of Ukraine
Ministry of Energy (Ukraine)
Companies based in Kyiv
Government-owned companies of Ukraine
Oil companies of Ukraine
Natural gas companies of Ukraine
Natural gas pipeline companies
Energy companies established in 1991
Non-renewable resource companies established in 1991
Ukrainian companies established in 1991
Natural resource conflicts
Ukraine
Ukrainian brands